The State quality mark of the USSR (translit. ) was the official Soviet mark for the certification of quality established in 1967.

Symbol 

The sign was a pentagonal shield with a rotated letter K (from Russian word  – quality) stylized as scales below the Cyrillic abbreviation for USSR.

History 
It was used to mark consumer, production, and technical goods to certify that they met quality standards and, in general, to increase the effectiveness of the production system in the USSR.

The goods themselves or their packaging were marked, as was the accompanying documentation, labels or tags. Rules of its use were defined by GOST, an acronym for "state standard", section 1.9-67 (April 7, 1967).

The right to use the sign was leased to the enterprises for 2–3 years based on the examination of the goods by the State Attestation Commission that should certify that the goods are of the "higher quality category". That is:
 their quality "meets or exceeds the quality of the best international analogs",
 parameters of quality are stable,
 goods fully satisfy Soviet state standards,
 goods are compatible with international standards,
 production of goods is economically effective, and
 they satisfy the demands of the state economy and the population.

Obtaining the sign allowed the enterprises to increase the state controlled price for the goods by ten percent. When the sign was introduced it indeed suggested high quality of the goods but after some time a lot of Soviet-made goods were certified for the sign while their quality often remained below expectations of customers.

After dissolution of the Soviet Union, the Russian government introduced its own sign for certification of quality, known as the Rostest mark (or R mark).

See also
 Certification mark
 State Emblem of the Soviet Union
 Rostest – organization responsible for the newer Rostest mark

References

Economy of the Soviet Union
Soviet brands
Certification marks
Consumer symbols
1967 establishments in the Soviet Union